Head of the River Church is a historic Methodist church on Route 49 in Estell Manor, Atlantic County, New Jersey, United States.

It was built in 1792 and added to the National Register of Historic Places in 1979.

See also
 National Register of Historic Places listings in Atlantic County, New Jersey

References

Churches on the National Register of Historic Places in New Jersey
Churches completed in 1792
18th-century Methodist church buildings in the United States
Churches in Atlantic County, New Jersey
Methodist churches in New Jersey
National Register of Historic Places in Atlantic County, New Jersey
New Jersey Register of Historic Places
1792 establishments in New Jersey